The National Party for Solidarity and Development (Parti National pour la Solidarité et le Developpement; PNSD) is a minor political party in Algeria.

History and profile
The National Party for Solidarity and Development was established in 1989. Rabah Bencherif was the leader of the party. The current leader is Dalila Yalaqui.

In the 17 May 2007 People's National Assembly elections, the party won 2.08% of the vote and 2 out of 389 seats. It also won four seats in the 2012 elections.

References

1989 establishments in Algeria
Political parties established in 1989
Political parties in Algeria